Chorizo de Pamplona is a sausage that is typical in the cuisine of the Navarre region of Spain. It is prepared with equal parts of finely chopped beef and pork and significant amounts of a strong smoked paprika, pork fat and a natural or plastic casing which is designated to have a minimum size of forty millimeters in diameter. The red-orange coloration is due to the addition of paprika, which is abundant in Navarre. Despite its local name, it is a very common type of sausage in delicatessens around the Spanish territory. It is also produced and sold in Pamplona, Spain.

Characteristics
Chorizo de Pamplona is a fermented, cured and dried sausage, and its texture is typically dry. It has been described as having similar qualities to that of pepperoni sausage. Its flavor has been described as tangy, salty, and as having a slight bitterness derived from the pimentón (Spanish smoked paprika) used in its preparation.

See also

 List of sausages
 Spanish cuisine

References

Further reading
 

Spanish sausages